Sheikh Hafizur Rahman (born 31 March 1952) is a Bangladeshi politician. He has served as a member of the Jatiyo Sangshad since 2014, representing Narail-2 for the Workers Party of Bangladesh. He is a member of the Trustee Board of the Bangabandhu Memorial Trust. He is cousin of Sheikh Mujibur Rahman and his wife Sheikh Anne Rahman, was a member of Parliament from reserved seat for women.

References

Living people
1952 births
Workers Party of Bangladesh politicians
10th Jatiya Sangsad members
Bangladeshi communists
20th-century Bangladeshi lawyers
21st-century Bangladeshi lawyers
Sheikh Mujibur Rahman family